Several factors affect citizens' health in Toronto.

Description
The city is part of the Toronto Public Health Division, and is home to many hospitals.

Another risk to health for citizens is exposure to crime in the city.  Toronto has a rate of violent crime of 738 incidents per 100,000 people, though this is still lower than the national average of 951, according to 2006 Statistics Canada data, and far lower than other cities of comparable size (particularly those in the United States).

Governance
Several municipally funded programs affect health in the city.  They are listed below, and where possible their annual budgets are provided.  Provincial and federal programs also affect health in Toronto, such as the provincial Smoke-Free Ontario Act which bans cigarette smoking in enclosed spaces in the province.
 Toronto Parks, Forestry and Recreation Division ($239,953,000, 2004)
 Toronto Police Services ($707,573,000, 2004)
 Toronto Public Health ($182,672,000, 2004)
 Toronto Water Division

History of public administration 

All municipalities had their own public health programs, meaning a patchwork of systems throughout Ontario, including within the modern borders of Toronto. For example, the Town of Mimico, Town of New Toronto, and Village of Long Branch each had their own program, despite the communities bordering each other within a few kilometre stretch of Lakeshore Road.

Metropolitan Toronto was created in 1954 as a measure to encourage collaboration between the urban municipalities in southern York County. In 1960, the Toronto Board of Health chair called for a Metro-wide board, stating "epidemics don't recognize municipal boundaries. The present chaotic division of health responsibilities in ridiculous."

Premier John Robarts' government looked to find efficiencies in local governance. That included Health Minister Dr. Matthew Dymond proposing a joint board of health for Metro's six municipalities. Local Medical Officers of Health and board chairs largely balked at the idea, announced in 1967, even though the province offered to pay 75% of costs, instead of the previous 25%. It was thought that a merger would raise costs, that one body couldn't serve 2 million residents, and that a merger might lead to a "lowest common denominator" approach. Dymond remained firm, noting that other large municipalities had been successful in such transitions.

Organizations
Health organizations in Toronto include:
 List of hospitals in Toronto
 Canadian Association of Food Banks
 Centre for Addiction and Mental Health
The Crohn's and Colitis Foundation of Canada 
Heart and Stroke Foundation 
Canadian Cancer Society 
Alzheimer Society of Canada 
Alzheimer Society of Ontario 
Leukemia & Lymphoma Society of Canada 
Canadian Breast Cancer Foundation
Canadian Foundation for AIDS Research
Cystic Fibrosis Canada 
Canadian Mental Health Association 
ALS Society of Canada 
Canadian Organization for Rare Disorders
The Canadian Hearing Society
JDRF
Kidney Foundation of Canada
Multiple Sclerosis Society of Canada
Muscular Dystrophy Canada

The city hosted the 2006 XVI International AIDS Conference.

See also
 Determinants of health

References